Pristava is a former settlement in the Municipality of Moravče in central Slovenia. It is now part of the village of Limbarska Gora. The area is part of the traditional region of Upper Carniola. The municipality is now included in the Central Slovenia Statistical Region.

Geography
Pristava lies in the northeast part of the village of Limbarska Gora, near the crest of the hill ascending to the main settlement.

History
Pristava had a population of 23 living in three houses in 1900. Pristava was annexed by Limbarska Gora (at that time still called Sveti Valentin) in 1952, ending its existence as an independent settlement.

References

External links
Pristava on Geopedia

Populated places in the Municipality of Moravče
Former settlements in Slovenia